Ornativalva indica is a moth of the family Gelechiidae. It was described by Sattler in 1967. It is found in southern Iran (Luristan), Pakistan (Peshawar) and India (Bihar).

Adults have been recorded on wing from May to July.

The larvae feed on Tamarix species, possibly Tamarix indica.

References

Moths described in 1967
Ornativalva